The Tour de France is an annual multiple stage bicycle race primarily held in France.

Tour de France may also refer to:

Sport
 Tour de France Femmes, women's road cycling multi-stage tour
 Tour de France à la voile, sailing
 Tour de France Automobile, rally

Other uses
 Compagnons du Tour de France, French journeymen's fraternity of medieval origin
 Charles IX's grand tour of France, a royal tour by Charles IX of the Kingdom of France from 1564 to 1566
 Tour de France Soundtracks, a 2003 music album by Kraftwerk, remastered in 2009 and retitled Tour de France
 "Tour de France" (song), a 1983 and 1999 single also by Kraftwerk
 Tour de France (video game series) based on the cycle race
 Tour de France (film), a 2016 French film

See also
 Tour France, a residential skyscraper in La Défense, west of Paris, France
 Tours, France, city in central France
 Le Tour de la France par deux enfants, 1877 didactic children's novel
 A Little Tour in France, 1884 book of travel writing by Henry James
 Le Tour de France 88, 1988 album by France Gall
 La Course by Le Tour de France, single stage classic, women's road cycling race
 France national rugby union team tours